The 1930 Army Cadets football team represented the United States Military Academy in the 1930 college football season. In their first season under head coach Ralph Sasse, the Cadets compiled a 9–1–1 record, shut out seven of their eleven opponents, and outscored all opponents by a combined total of 268 to 22, an average of 24.4 points scored and 2.0 points allowed per game.
 
Two Army players were recognized on the All-America team. Tackle Jack Price received first-team honors from the North American Newspaper Association (NANA) and the Los Angeles Times. Guard Charles Humber received second-team honors from the International News Service (INS) and third-team honors from the Associated Press

Schedule

References

Army
Army Black Knights football seasons
Army Cadets football